Stromberg is a quarter of Oelde with 4558 inhabitants. It lies to the southeast of Oelde on  Bundesstraße 61, in the district of Warendorf and the region of Münster. The Baroque philosopher Hermann Nicephorus and the 18th-century artist Theobald von Oer were both born here.

External links

 Information on Stromberg

Towns in North Rhine-Westphalia